Dany Dauberson (16 January 192516 March 1979) was a French singer and actress.

Eurovision 

Dauberson was born in Le Creusot, Saône-et-Loire, France. On 24 May 1956, at the first Eurovision Song Contest, held at the Teatro Kursaal in Lugano, each participating country had two entrants due to the format of the competition's first year. Dany Dauberson, one of the French entrants, performed the song "Il est là" ("He's Here") while Mathé Altéry, the other French entrant, sang "Le Temps Perdu" ("Lost Time"). Dany Dauberson's score and placing remain undisclosed to this day as only the winner was announced.

Car crash 

In April 1967, while driving towards Duranville, Eure, on the N13, she skidded off the road and crashed into a tree. Dauberson was thrown out of her seat and through the windscreen while in the passenger's seat her companion, actress Nicole Berger, suffered both a fractured skull and a crushed rib cage. Dauberson and Berger were rushed to hospital, where Berger died from her injuries. Dauberson never fully recovered emotionally or physically from the crash, which ended her career as a singer. She died in 1979, at the age of 54.

She was buried in the town of Saint-Claude in the Jura department, where she had spent part of her youth.

Filmography 
1951 : L'Inconnue des cinq cités (A Tale of Five Cities)
1954 : Soirs de Paris, by Jean Laviron
1957 : Et par ici la sortie, by Willy Rozier : Florina
1957 : C'est arrivé à 36 chandelles, by Henri Diamant-Berger : herself
1966 : Du rififi à Paname, by Denys de La Patellière : Léa

References

External links
 

1925 births
1979 deaths
People from Le Creusot
Eurovision Song Contest entrants for France
Eurovision Song Contest entrants of 1956
20th-century French  women  singers
Road incident deaths in France